is a passenger railway station  located in the town of Chizu, Yazu District, Tottori Prefecture, Japan.. It is operated by the West Japan Railway Company (JR West).

Lines
Only local trains stop at this station.

Station layout
The station consists of two ground-level opposed side platforms connected to the station building by a level crossing. The station is unattended.

Platforms

Adjacent stations

History
Nagi Station opened on July 1, 1932.  With the privatization of the Japan National Railways (JNR) on April 1, 1987, the station came under the aegis of the West Japan Railway Company.

Passenger statistics
In fiscal 2015, the station was used by an average of 54 passengers daily.

Surrounding area
Japan National Route 53

See also
List of railway stations in Japan

References

External links 

 Nagi Station from JR-Odekake.net 

Railway stations in Tottori Prefecture
Railway stations in Japan opened in 1932
Chizu, Tottori